Première femme de Chambre ('First Chamber Maid') was an office at the royal court of France.

The Première femme de Chambre was in charge of the preparing of clothes, cosmetics and other things in the queen's wardrobe for the dressing and undressing ceremony, and supervised the femmes de chambre ('Chamber Maids'), who often reached a number of 16 per annum. The dressing and undressing of the queen was in turn supervised by the dame d'atour. A Première femme de Chambre was not formally ranked as a lady-in-waiting but rather belonged to the chamber staff and as such (as formally a servant and lady's maid rather than a lady-in-waiting) did not need to be a member of the nobility. 

The Première femme de Chambre was the only one of the women of the queen's household except the dame d'honneur to be in possession of the keys to the queen's rooms and in permanent access to the queen.    This gave her the opportunity to filter requests of meetings, audiences and messages to the queen and made her a de facto powerful person at court, where she was often flattered and bribed by the courtiers.

In 1775, the office of Première femme de Chambre was split in four, between Julie Louise Bibault de Misery and her three deputies Henriette Campan, Marie-Élisabeth Thibault and Quelpée La Borde Regnier de Jarjayes, who took turns serving: they were all still in service when the queen's household was dissolved in 1792, at that time in supervision of six chamber maids (femme du chambre).

Examples

 Antoinette de Jorron, Demoiselle du Boucquet, to Anne of Austria in 1616–1618
 Genevieve Robert, Dame du Bellier, to Anne of Austria in 1618–1636
 Marie Chesneau, Dame de Filandre, to Anne of Austria in 1636–1646
 Catherine Bellier, to Anne of Austria in 1646–1666
 Maria Molina, to Maria Theresa of Spain.
 Julie Louise Bibault de Misery, to Marie Antoinette.
 Jeanne Louise Henriette Campan, to Marie Antoinette.

See also
 Woman of the Bedchamber, British equivalent
 Kammarfru, German and Nordic equivalent

References

Ancien Régime
Ancien Régime office-holders
French monarchy
Court titles in the Ancien Régime
Gendered occupations
French royal court